|}

The Sapphire Stakes is a Group 2 flat horse race in Ireland open to thoroughbreds aged three years or older. It is run at the Curragh over a distance of 5 furlongs (1,006 metres), and it is scheduled to take place each year in July.

The event was established in 2001, and it was originally classed at Listed level. For several years it was registered as the Richard H. Faught Memorial Stakes. It was renamed the Sapphire Stakes and promoted to Group 3 status in 2008. It was raised to Group 2 level in 2015.

The Sapphire Stakes was originally part of the Curragh's three-day Irish Derby Festival meeting. In 2015 it was moved to the Irish Oaks meeting and it is currently held on the second day, the day after the Irish Oaks.

Records

Most successful horse (2 wins):
 Benbaun – 2005, 2009

Leading jockey (3 wins):
 Johnny Murtagh – Deportivo (2003), Snaefell (2007), Definightly (2012)

Leading trainer (2 wins):
 Michael Halford – Snaefell (2007), Invincible Ash (2011)
 Roger Charlton - Deportivo (2003), Definightly (2012)

Winners

See also
 Horse racing in Ireland
 List of Irish flat horse races

References
 Racing Post:
 
 galopp-sieger.de – Sapphire Stakes.
 horseracingintfed.com – International Federation of Horseracing Authorities – Sapphire Stakes (2018).

Flat races in Ireland
Curragh Racecourse
Open sprint category horse races
Recurring sporting events established in 2001